Love Me or Leave Me may refer to:

 "Love Me or Leave Me", a song by Kerli on the EP Utopia
 "Love Me or Leave Me" (Donaldson and Kahn song), a popular 1920s song from the Broadway play Whoopee!
 Love Me or Leave Me (film), a 1955 biographical movie starring Doris Day as Ruth Etting
 Love Me or Leave Me (Doris Day album), based on the soundtrack of the 1955 film
 Love Me or Leave Me, a 1988 album from the group The Gyrlz that later became Terri & Monica
 Love Me or Leave Me (2010 film), a TV musical film starring Carl Anthony Payne II
 Love Me or Leave Me (Chad Brownlee album), 2012
 "Love Me or Leave Me", a song by Raven-Symoné from Raven-Symoné
 Love Me or Leave Me (TV series), a Taiwanese television drama
 "Love Me or Leave Me", a song by Little Mix from the 2015 album Get Weird